The Sudanese British Society Of Disabled People is a non-profit organisation located in London. It consists of a group of disabled and able-bodied Sudanese working on increasing the level of awareness around the issue of disability, and informing disabled individuals of their rights so they can participate in society as equals to other citizens.

Goals

There is a large number of disabled people in Sudan. In addition to natural factors that cause disability in all countries, the situation is exacerbated in Sudan by civil wars and its dire consequences as displacement, poverty, poor medical services and a look of disgust that haunts the disabled. This is making the situation of disabled persons in Sudan exceptionally poor compared to other countries because they suffer from discrimination and exclusion, as they are isolated from each other and society as a whole.

Based on the above and in order to accelerate the improvement of the situation of the disabled in the Sudan the idea of a British Sudanese Association for people with disabilities was born to deal with the affairs of the disabled in the Sudan. The association is devoted to improving the situation of the disabled Sudanese and linking them to their counterparts in other countries to benefit from their experiences. It works as entity that combines the efforts of the disabled in the United Kingdom and Sudan to create favourable conditions for the establishment of their own organisations and accomplish their goals according to their needs and circumstances.

Therefore, the most important goals of the British Sudanese Association for people with disabilities is to help the disabled to take advantage of their potential and engage in society as active members and helping them to live free from fear, discrimination and mistreatment. To keep working on that goal, a centre dedicated to studying the issues of disability inn Sudan was established. Among the tasks of the centre are the dissemination of public awareness about disability issues and working with decision-making circles in favour of persons with disabilities.

External links

2012 establishments in the United Kingdom
Non-profit organisations based in London
Organizations established in 2012